The British Ambassador's residence in Washington, D.C. is located at 3100 Massachusetts Avenue, Northwest, Washington, D.C. in the Embassy Row neighborhood.

It was commissioned in 1925, and designed by Sir Edwin Lutyens in 1928. An example of Queen Anne architecture, the residence is the only building Lutyens designed in North America. Frederick H. Brooke, the on-site American architect, assisted with the design and oversaw the construction of the embassy, which was conducted by noted developer Harry Wardman.

The home is the most prominent part of a compound that also includes the offices of the embassy chancery and is a contributing property to the Massachusetts Avenue Historic District, which is listed on the National Register of Historic Places. 

Prince Charles and Princess Diana stayed at the residence during their 1985 visit to Washington, D.C.
Its 2009 property value is $31,308,480. There are about 10,000 visitors each year.

See also
 Embassy of the United Kingdom, Washington, D.C.
 Winfield House, the equivalent American residence in London

Further reading
Anthony Seldon, Daniel Collings, The Architecture of Diplomacy: The British Ambassador's Residence in Washington, Random House Incorporated, 2014, 
A History of the Gardens of the Ambassador's Residence, British Embassy, Washington

References

External links

The British Embassy – Ambassador's residence
The British Ambassador's Residence Washington DC, Chantal Condron, Alison Fuller, Government Art Collection, 2005, 
A History of the Gardens of the Ambassador's Residence, British Embassy, Washington

Houses completed in 1928
Diplomatic residences in Washington, D.C.
United Kingdom–United States relations
Historic district contributing properties in Washington, D.C.